Geldermalsen is a town and former municipality in the province of Gelderland in the Netherlands.

Town of Geldermalsen
The town centre of Geldermalsen contains a two-aisled Gothic church dating from the 15th century, with a Romanesque tower dating from the 13th century. The town contains two windmills: De Watermolen, which was built in 1772, and De Bouwing, which was built in 1848. Located in the east side there is a graveyard.

Public high-school 'The Lingeborgh' is located in the west.

Former municipality of Geldermalsen
The municipality of Geldermalsen was formed on 1 January 1978, when the former municipalities of Beesd, Buurmalsen, Deil and Geldermalsen were combined. On 1 January 2019 it merged with Neerijnen en Lingewaal to form the new municipality West Betuwe.

The river Linge flows through the municipality and town of Geldermalsen.

Population centres
 Acquoy
 Beesd
 Buurmalsen
 Deil
 Enspijk
 Geldermalsen
 Gellicum
 Meteren
 Rhenoy
 Rumpt
 Tricht

Demographics 
Ethnic composition of Geldermalsen in 2010:
 Dutch: 91.7%
 Black: 0.9%
 European: 4.5%
 Arabs: 1.4%
 Other non-Western: 1.4%:

See also 
 2015 Geldermalsen riot

References

External links

West Betuwe
Former municipalities of Gelderland
Populated places in Gelderland
States and territories established in 1978
Municipalities of the Netherlands disestablished in 2019